Most Popular Nordic DJ is a voting process developed and run by Megamind, a website focusing on Nordic clubbing and DJ culture in the following countries of Sweden, Norway, Denmark and Finland. The voting process is a way to determine who is the most popular Nordic DJ. Eligible recipients are Swedish, Danish, Norwegian or Finnish DJs, producers or artists who use DJing as a way of performance. Live acts are also counted if they include at least one person who DJs.

The vote started in 2003. The voting takes place between September 1 of each year until January 31 of the following year, making it the longest running vote in the world of its kind.

Results 
Winners of the title "Most Popular Nordic DJ" in past years are:
2003 - DJ Orkidea (Finland)
2004 - Airbase (Sweden) (Voting halted after server crash in December 2004 and therefore is incomplete)
2005 - DJ Orkidea (Finland)
2006 - Tim Andresen (Denmark)
2007 - DJ Orkidea (Finland)
2008 - Marcus Schossow (Sweden)
2009 - Marcus Schossow (Sweden)

Top 5 winners 2003:
DJ Orkidea (Finland)
Miss Jarea (Norway)
Sebastian Voght (Sweden)
Adam Beyer (Sweden)
Sekas (Sweden)

Top 5 winners 2004:
Airbase (Sweden)
Miss Jarea (Norway)
DJ Irish (Sweden)
Tim Andresen (Denmark)
zanta (Finland)

Top 5 winners 2005:
DJ Orkidea (Finland)
Darude (Finland)
Proteus (Finland)
DJ Anneli (Sweden)
Miika Kuisma (Finland)

Top 5 winners 2006:
Tim Andresen (Denmark)
DJ Orkidea (Finland)
Darude (Finland)
Proteus (Finland)
Özgur Can (Sweden)

Top 5 winners 2007:
DJ Orkidea (Finland)
Sasha F (Finland)
Proteus (Finland)
Darude (Finland)
Tim Andresen (Denmark)

Top 5 winners 2008:
Marcus Schossow (Sweden)
Maku L (Finland)
Sasha F (Finland)
DJ Orkidea (Finland)
CiD Inc. (Denmark)

Top 5 winners 2009:
Marcus Schossow (Sweden)
Sasha F (Finland)
Maku L (Finland)
DJ Orkidea (Finland)
Proteus (Finland)

References

External links 
Most Popular Nordic DJ Vote

Swedish music awards
Norwegian music awards
Danish music awards
Finnish music awards
DJing
Awards established in 2003